Invisible touch may refer to:

 Invisible touch (magic trick), a magic trick which gives the illusion a person is being touched seemingly without visible contact
 Invisible Touch, the thirteenth studio album by the English rock band Genesis
 Invisible Touch (song), the title track and first single from the 1986 album of the same name by the English rock band Genesis